Sylvan Adams (born November 1, 1958) is an Israeli-Canadian billionaire businessman and philanthropist.

Background and career 
Adams was born and raised in Quebec City, Canada. He served for close to 25 years as president and CEO of Iberville Developments, one of Canada's largest real-estate development companies founded by his father, Marcel. At the end of 2015, he emigrated to Israel (made Aliyah) and settled in Tel Aviv.

Philanthropy 
He donates money for many sports and educational activities. He established the Margaret and Sylvan Adams Family Foundation to support educational and medical projects in Israel and Canada. The foundation offers doctoral scholarships at the Israel Academy of Sciences and Humanities. The "Bonei Zion Prize" is given every year with his name by Nefesh b'Nefesh. The award recognizes immigrants to Israel from English-speaking countries who have impacted Israel in the fields of science and medicine, education and nonprofit work, national service, business, technology and culture, and arts and sports. It was established in 2013 with Adams assistance and offers each recipient with a $10,000 prize.

In 2018, he donated $5 million to SpaceIL, the non-profit organization that is working to land the first Israeli spacecraft on the moon. In 2019, Adams was reported to be funding the cost of a performance by Madonna at the 2019 Eurovision Song Contest.

In 2019 he donated 100 million NIS for a new emergency medicine wing at the Ichilov Medical Center in Tel Aviv. He also donated money for a new children's hospital at the Wolfson Medical Center in Holon.

Cycling 
Adams has a passion for cycling, taking it up only in his 40s. In November 2017, he won the World Masters Championship in Manchester, England and has been a world time-trial champion many times. He is co-owner of the Israel Cycling Academy (ICA). The team was founded in 2015 as a UCI Pro Continental team and made the jump up to UCI World Tour level in 2020. The team is now known as Israel–Premier Tech. In 2017 the first institute for sport's excellency in Israel was established in Tel Aviv University and is called the Sylvan Adams Cycling Network. He also donated money along with KKL-JNF Canada and others for the Sylvan Adams Commuter Path, a biking path which connects Tel Aviv with surrounding areas to allow people to commute to work by bicycle more quickly and safely. 

In May 2018, he established the first indoor velodrome in Israel and the Middle East. He also donated $2m for the redevelopment of the Bromont Velodrome in Quebec.

He was the first to suggest the Giro d'Italia 2018 take place in Israel and donated 80 million dollars for this purpose. This was the first time that any stage of the Giro tour took place outside of Europe. He was named the Honorary President of the 2018 Giro d'Italia as a result.

Family 
His father is Marcel Adams, a Canadian real estate investor, philanthropist and Holocaust survivor.

References

Canadian billionaires
Jewish Canadian philanthropists
1958 births
Canadian people of Romanian-Jewish descent
Canadian real estate businesspeople
Israeli businesspeople
Israeli cyclists
Living people
Giving Pledgers
21st-century philanthropists